"Hourglass" is a song by British electronic music duo Disclosure. It features vocals from Lion Babe. The single was released on 11 September 2015, by PMR Records and Island Records, as the third promotional from their studio album Caracal.

Charts

References

2015 singles
2015 songs
Disclosure (band) songs
UK garage songs
Songs written by Jimmy Napes
Songs written by Guy Lawrence
Songs written by Howard Lawrence
Island Records singles